Douglas James Roche, OC, KCSG (born June 14, 1929) is a Canadian author, parliamentarian, diplomat and peace activist. Roche served as Progressive Conservative Member of Parliament (MP) for Edmonton—Strathcona from 1972 to 1979 and for Edmonton South 1979–1984. In 1984, he was appointed Canada's Ambassador for Disarmament, a position he held until 1989. He was appointed to the Senate of Canada on September 17, 1998, where he served until June 13, 2004.  Currently he resides in Edmonton, Alberta.

History
Born in Montreal, Quebec, Douglas Roche has long been concerned with the issue of nuclear disarmament. He was elected Chairman of the United Nations Disarmament Committee, the main United Nations body dealing with political and security issues, at the 43rd General Assembly in 1988. He is also the author of twenty books, and has contributed chapters to thirteen more, including Creative Dissent: A Politician's Struggle for Peace (Novalis, 2008). From 1989 to 2001, he was appointed Visiting Professor at the University of Alberta, where he taught "War or Peace in the 21st Century?" In 1997, he was chosen by the Students' Union to receive a SALUTE Award for "outstanding contributions to students".

He is an Officer of the Order of Canada, and a leading organizer of the project in which more than 500 members of the Order of Canada have endorsed a call for Canada to commit to working with other countries to achieve a Nuclear Weapons Convention, which would be a global ban on nuclear weapons.

He is the founding Chairman of the Middle Powers Initiative, co-sponsored by eight international non-governmental organizations specializing in nuclear disarmament; he now serves as Senior Advisor to the current Chairman, Ambassador Henrik Salander of Sweden.

In 1995, Pope John Paul II presented him with the Papal Medal for his service as Special Adviser on disarmament and security matters. In 1998, the Holy See named him a Knight Commander of the Order of St. Gregory the Great.

Roche has served as President of the United Nations Association in Canada and was elected in 1985 as Honorary President of the World Federation of United Nations Associations. He was the founding President of Parliamentarians for Global Action, an international network of 1,300 parliamentarians in 99 countries, and wrote The Case for a United Nations Parliamentary Assembly in 2002. He was also founding editor of the Western Catholic Reporter (1965–1972); and International Chairman (1990–1996) of Global Education Associates.

In 2009, Roche was the recipient of the Distinguished Service Award of the Canadian Association of Former Parliamentarians, "presented annually to a former parliamentarian who has made an outstanding contribution to the country and its democratic institutions." Roche was cited in particular "for his years of Parliamentary service, for his contribution to and respect for the institution of Parliament and for his continued interest and activity in the promotion of human welfare, human rights and parliamentary democracy in Canada and abroad."

Published works

Archives 
There is a Douglas Roche fonds at Library and Archives Canada.

See also
List of peace activists

References

External links
Personal website

Global Security Institute

1929 births
Canadian diplomats
Canadian political scientists
Canadian Roman Catholics
Canadian senators from Alberta
Independent Canadian senators
Living people
Members of the House of Commons of Canada from Alberta
Officers of the Order of Canada
Politicians from Montreal
Progressive Conservative Party of Canada MPs
Academic staff of the University of Alberta
21st-century Canadian politicians
Canadian anti–nuclear weapons activists